Gumbert is a surname. Notable people with the surname include:

 Ad Gumbert (1868–1925), American baseball player
 Billy Gumbert (1865–1946), American baseball player
 Ferdinand Gumbert (1818–1896), German composer, singing teacher, and music critic
 Harry Gumbert (1909–1995), American baseball player

See also
 Gondelbert, saint